Should God Forget: A Retrospective is a compilation album by the English rock band the Psychedelic Furs, released as a double CD in 1997 by Legacy Records.

Track listing

Disc 1
 "India"  – 6:22
 "Sister Europe"  – 5:39
 "Pulse"  – 2:39
 "Mack the Knife"  – 5:59
 "Blacks/Radio"  – 6:50
 "We Love You"  – 3:27
 "Imitation of Christ"  – 5:38
 "Soap Commercial"  – 3:50
 "Pretty in Pink (Original Version)"  – 3:58
 "Mr. Jones"  – 4:02
 "Into You Like A Train"  – 4:33
 "I Wanna Sleep With You"  – 3:17
 "Merry Go Round (Yes I Do)"  – 3:51
 "President Gas"  – 5:17
 "Love My Way"  – 3:33
 "Sleep Comes Down"  – 3:51
 "I Don't Want to Be Your Shadow"  – 3:48

Disc 2
 "Alice's House"  – 4:16
 "The Ghost in You"  – 4:16
 "Here Come Cowboys"  – 3:56
 "Heaven"  – 3:26
 "Highwire Days"  – 4:08
 "Heartbeat"  – 5:03
 "All of the Law"  – 5:42
 "Heartbreak Beat"  – 5:14
 "All That Money Wants"  – 3:45
 "Entertain Me"  – 5:00
 "Should God Forget"  – 4:21
 "Torch"  – 4:48
 "Get a Room"  – 4:45
 "Until She Comes"  – 3:48
 "All About You"  – 4:17
 "There's a World"  – 4:46 (though it continues at the 5:15 mark with a hidden bonus track, an alternate version of "Dumb Waiters"

References

The Psychedelic Furs albums
1997 compilation albums
Legacy Recordings compilation albums